Charkint, or Chahar Kint, is a district in Balkh province, Afghanistan. It has a population of 32,306. The district administration is located in Shar Shar area of Charkint district, which means "four clusters/towns" - from Persian chahār, "four", and Sogdian kand, "town" (Turkicized to kint).

See also 
 Districts of Afghanistan

References

External links
 UN Map of Chahar Kint District

Districts of Balkh Province